The J. Lawrence Walkup Skydome is an indoor multipurpose stadium in the southwestern United States, located on the campus of Northern Arizona University (NAU) in Flagstaff, Arizona. It is primarily used as the home of the NAU Lumberjacks football and both men's and women's basketball teams of the Big Sky Conference. The seating capacity is 11,230, with 10,000 permanent seats and 1,230 seats in portable bleachers.

History
When it opened on September 15, 1977, the stadium did not have a name. The inaugural football game was a one-point conference win over Montana before 12,860 on  it hosted five games that first season, with an average attendance  NAU football was previously played outdoors on natural grass at Lumberjack Stadium. The dome hosted the Big Sky men's basketball tournament in 1987, 1997, 1998, 

For its first six years, the Walkup Skydome was the world's largest clear-span timber dome, until the completion of the Tacoma Dome in Tacoma, Washington, in 1983.  was Wendell Rossman of Phoenix, also responsible for many other buildings on the surrounding NAU campus. Mardian Construction Company also of Phoenix was general contractor.  used in construction of Walkup Skydome was southern yellow pine. At its launching in 1977, it was the third indoor football stadium in the Big Sky Conference: Holt Arena at Idaho State in Pocatello opened in 1970 (as the "Minidome") and the Kibbie Dome at Idaho in Moscow was enclosed in 1975, after four years as an outdoor venue.

The Skydome is named after J. Lawrence Walkup (1914–2002), the president of NAU from 1957 to 1979, a period of tremendous growth for the university. During an era of tight budgets in the mid-1970s, he creatively coordinated financing for the venue. More than half of the $8 million project came from voluntary student fee increases, supplemented with $1.5 million in legislative funding and a campus fund of $2 million from two decades of vending-machine revenue. The athletic director at NAU at the time was Hank Anderson, who served from 1974 through 1983. The two-year-old Skydome was named for Walkup after his retirement in 1979.

From its 1977 opening until 2002, the football playing surface was AstroTurf. This was changed to infilled FieldTurf in 2002.

Renovation
The building underwent a major renovation from December 2010 to September  2011 at a cost of $26 million. The scope of the project included bringing the fire, life, and safety up to code while remodeling the bathrooms, concourse, offices, suites, locker rooms, and press box. The athletic training and equipment on the main floor were also remodeled and three elevators were added to the complex. Fans now enter the building to a panoramic view of the field on the east and west concourses. Capacity was reduced to 10,000, but it now features 21-in-wide chair-back seating.

Other uses
Besides sporting events, the arena is also used for commencement ceremonies, concerts, and other events such as conventions and trade shows.  The arena floor features  of space.

The Walkup Skydome was formerly  used by the NFL's Arizona Cardinals during their summer training camp, held at NAU. The Cardinals could move inside to conduct practice when the weather was unsuitable outdoors.

See also
 List of NCAA Division I FCS football stadiums
 List of NCAA Division I basketball arenas
 List of convention centers in the United States

References

External links
 
 NAU Athletics – official site – facilities

Sports venues completed in 1977
Sports venues in Arizona
College football venues
College basketball venues in the United States
Covered stadiums in the United States
Geodesic domes
Northern Arizona Lumberjacks basketball
Northern Arizona Lumberjacks football
Basketball venues in Arizona
Convention centers in Arizona
Multi-purpose stadiums in the United States
Buildings and structures in Flagstaff, Arizona
Tourist attractions in Coconino County, Arizona
Event venues established in 1977
1977 establishments in Arizona